The University of the Philippines Town Center, commonly known as the U.P. Town Center abbreviated as UPTC is a shopping center in Quezon City, Metro Manila, Philippines, managed by the Ayala Malls group. It opened on September 30, 2013.

Development
Ayala Land secured a 25-year lease contract with the University of the Philippines to develop the  lot which is part of the university's campus to build a shopping mall complex. The lot was the former location of the U.P. Integrated School under the University of the Philippines Diliman. The trees already in the lot were not cut down and 40 percent of the land are designated for open space.

The U.P. Town Center has three phases. It also hosts a 2-level Timezone arcade. The second phase containing more retail and dining outlets covering a  floor plan that was completed by May 2015. The third and last phase which would cover  was completed in 2016, containing four cinemas, including one 4DX cinema, offices as well as more retail stores and restaurants, including a 2-storey H&M store.

Architecture
The architectural design and master planning of the U.P. Town Center was done by international architectural firm Benoy.

Facilities and tenants
The U.P. Town Center is marketed as the "first and only university town center" in the Philippines primarily targeting students from universities and other educational institutions along Katipunan Avenue such as the University of the Philippines Diliman, Ateneo de Manila University, and Miriam College.

Initially, shortly after the first phase of the complex was opened, most of the tenants were restaurants and other dining outlets. In November 2013, there were 30 tenants with 28 of them being dining outlets and only two being retail stores. By this time, Ayala Malls were reportedly prioritizing new restaurant and dining brands over popular fast-food chains and restaurants since many of these brands already have outlets along Katipunan Avenue.

Upon the completion of the second phase, numerous retail brands primarily selling fashion, sports, tech, and stationery goods or services targeting millennials opened stores at the U.P. Town Center.

U.P. Town Center also has a supermarket named Merkado Supermarket. It is a 50-50 joint venture between Ayala and Puregold and the outlet in the shopping complex is the first outlet under the brand name.

References

External links
U.P. Town Center Official website
UP Town Center at Ayala 360 website

Shopping malls in Quezon City
Buildings and structures in Quezon City
Shopping malls established in 2013
Ayala Malls
University of the Philippines Diliman